RCAF Station Weyburn was located  north-east of Weyburn, Saskatchewan, Canada at the hamlet of North Weyburn and was constructed in 1941 by the Royal Canadian Air Force (RCAF) as part of the British Commonwealth Air Training Plan. The Station was home to No. 41 Service Flying Training School and during its operation graduated 1,055 pilots and recorded more than 180,000 hours of flight time before being abandoned on 30 June 1944.

Aerodrome information 
Six runways were listed as follows:

Relief landing field – Halbrite 
The site was located south of the village of Halbrite. The Relief field was laid out in a triangle with three runways, detailed in the following table:

A review of Google Maps satellite imagery on 8 June 2018 shows no details indicating an airfield at the listed coordinates.

Relief landing field – Ralph 
The Relief field was detailed as "Turf - All way field - Servicable" and was drawn as a triangular layout with no dimensional information. A review of Google Maps satellite imagery on 8 June 2018 shows no details indicating an airfield at the listed coordinates.

See also 
 List of airports in Saskatchewan
 Weyburn Airport

References 

Military airbases in Saskatchewan
Weyburn
Weyburn
Military history of Saskatchewan
Defunct airports in Saskatchewan